School of Drama at The New School is a multidisciplinary training program for theater arts, located at 151 Bank Street, and 55 West 13th Street New York City, It is a  part of The New School's College of Performing Arts.

History
The graduate program was established in 2005 and grants Masters of Fine Arts degree in acting, directing and playwriting. Its early predecessor was the Dramatic Workshop (1940–49).

The undergraduate program was established in 2013 and offers students a multidisciplinary, studio-driven program that combines courses in acting, directing and playwriting. The four-year program grants a BFA in the Dramatic Arts.

Programs

Masters Program

The New School's theatrical MFA program was founded in 1994 in association with the Actors Studio.  The program existed as the Actors Studio Drama School until 2005, when the contract with the Studio came to end.

Following the split, New School President Bob Kerrey announced that the program would continue without the Studio as the New School for Drama, with Robert LuPone as Director. As a consequence, the classes of 2006 and 2007 enrolled in the Actors Studio Drama School, and graduated from the New School for Drama.
4
The program is a three-year intensive, offering Masters of Fine Arts in Acting, Directing or Playwriting.  The curriculum is highly collaborative, with students from all three majors working closely together.

Faculty
Current faculty for the MFA program includes Ron Leibman, Christopher Shinn, Jon Robin Baitz, Daniel Aukin, Peter J. Fernandez and Michael Weller.

Artist-in-Residence
For the 2014–15 school year Mark Ruffalo was School of Drama's artist in residence. Previous artists in residence have included David Hare (2013-2014), Kathleen Chalfant, playwrights Jon Robin Baitz (2009–10)
and John Patrick Shanley (2006–07), director Doug Hughes (2007–08), and actor John Turturro (2008–09).

Undergraduate Program
School of Drama's undergraduate program welcomed its inaugural class in August 2013. The inaugural class of 2017 comprises fifty young artists studying the disciplines of acting, directing, playwriting, and the Creative Technologies.

Curriculum

The BFA in Dramatic Arts is a multidisciplinary, studio driven program that combines courses in acting, writing, directing, aesthetic inquiry, and creative technologies. Through artistic training and project-based learning in various media, the students learn the skills of collaboration and artistic choice-making. They are then offered an array of electives in these different disciplines. The students may choose a focus, and utilize these electives to concentrate their study on a specific discipline. Students may also choose  electives to take a variety of different classes for a variety of theatrical disciplines.

Professional Training

The professional training provided by the program includes foundational courses, theater electives, general electives, research methods studios, reflective learning opportunities, performance and production opportunities, and a collaborative capstone experience.

Global Perspectives

BFA students make connections between concept and practice, and gain an increased familiarity with the works and intentions of playwrights, directors, and performers in both the Western and non-Western worlds.

Part of The New School

BFA students at School of Drama can take classes at Parsons and Eugene Lang College. Students can also choose a minor at Lang.

Productions
The Hot L Baltimore by Lanford Wilson, directed by Shelly Wyant (Fall 2013)
New Works Play Festival (Spring 2013) 
An Enemy of the People by Henrik Ibsen, translated by Arthur Miller (Spring 2014)

See also
 Education in New York City
 The New York Intellectuals
 Education in New York City
 The New York Foundation
 Project Pericles
 National Book Award

References

External links
 

Drama
Drama schools in the United States
Performing arts education in New York City
Universities and colleges in Manhattan
Universities and colleges in New York City
2005 establishments in New York City
Educational institutions established in 2005